1990: The Bronx Warriors is a 1982 Italian action-science fiction film directed by Enzo G. Castellari.

Plot
Ann is the 17-year-old heiress to the arms manufacturing giant, The Manhattan Corporation. Unable to face her guilt over inheriting a morally questionable company when she turns 18, Ann runs away into the lawless wasteland of New York's the Bronx. According to the film publicity:
"In the year 1990 the Bronx is officially declared No Man's Land. The authorities give up all attempts to restore law and order. From then on the area is ruled by the Riders".

Attacked by a roller skating gang called The Zombies, Ann is saved by members of The Riders, and taken under the protection of The Riders' leader, Trash. The Manhattan Corporation hires a ruthless and psychopathic mercenary named Hammer, who turns the various Bronx gangs against each other to ensure Ann is returned.

Cast
 Stefania Girolami as Anne
 Mark Gregory as Trash
 Vic Morrow as Hammer
 Christopher Connelly as Hot Dog
 Fred Williamson as The Ogre
 Elisabetta Dessy as Witch
 Rocco Lero as Paul
 George Eastman as Golem
 Carla Brait as Iron Man Leader
 John Loffredo as Ice
 Enio Girolami as Ted Fisher
 Enzo G Castellari as the Vice President
 Matt Malinowski as Hair Man

Production
The idea for the film was first envisioned by producer Fabrizio De Angelis when he missed a subway stop for his Manhattan hotel and ended up in a dangerous neighbourhood in the Bronx. De Angelis stated he imagined the idea of a futuristic city where young hoods would fight for their home.

1990: The Bronx Warriors was one of the three science fiction films Enzo G Castellari made with producer Fabrizio De Angelis. These films take influence from Mad Max 2 (1981), The Warriors (1979), and Escape From New York (1981). Castellari changed some of De Angelis' plot ideas while filming, including incorporating more weird gangs such as the roller skating gang. When discussing 1990: The Bronx Warriors, The New Barbarians and Escape from the Bronx, Castellari stated the three films were written, prepared and filmed in six months.

Italian regulations required that 50% of a film had to be shot in Italy. To solve this situation, the film was shot on location in the Bronx with interiors shot in Rome.

Release
1990: The Bronx Warriors was released on October 29, 1982, in Italy.

Reception and legacy
In a contemporary review, Kim Newman wrote in the Monthly Film Bulletin that the film contains the "usual virtues and vices of the Italian rip-off" noting that it was predominantly derivative of Escape from New York and The Warriors as well taking smaller elements from The Exterminator, Class of 1984 and Mad Max 2. Newman stated that "Castellari nimbly steals back all the stylistic elements that Carpenter and Hill poached from Leone's Westerns in the first place." The review praised the "attractive Panavision photography" and that the editing does "the best to conceal the fact that the epic battles and quests cover an extremely limited area of the Bronx." In his book Science Fiction, Phil Hardy also stated that the film was derivative of Escape From New York and The Warriors. The review went on to describe it as "riddled with narrative non-sequiteurs as it is devoid of cinematic imagination or élan." Variety referred to the film as an "exceedingly silly Italian action picture" that was "poorly scripted" and "lacks atmosphere". Variety praised Fred Williamson, stating that he "comes off as the best in the cast, handling himself smoothly in fight scenes which owe more to Italian sword 'n sandal programmers than recent violent epics." Alan Jones reviewed the film in Starburst, finding that Dardano Sacchetti's story "doesn't jell under Enzo G. Castellari's messy and pendantic direction" and that the film had "obnoxious characters".

AllMovie described the film as "one of the more successful examples of the post-apocalyptic action film genre that became popular during the early '80s" and that it was "probably too silly and overblown for a general audience, but is likely to please exploitation fans in search of cheap thrills". The review praised Sergio Salvati's cinematography and Walter Rizzati's rock music-oriented score. The review noted that these elements did not compensate for the films "sillier excesses" such as the roller-skating gang and that the leads of Stefania Girolami and Marco di Gregorio were bland protagonists.

A fan website exists for this movie, plus the 1983 sequel Escape from the Bronx. The creator Lance Manley is the subject of a 13-minute documentary on the 2015 Blu-ray release of 'Escape From the Bronx'. Entitled "The Hunt for Trash" it details his search for Mark Gregory, the star of both movies who has not been seen for decades.

RiffTrax spoofed the film on June 28, 2019.

See also
List of action films of the 1980s
List of Italian films of 1982
List of science fiction films of the 1980s

Notes

References

External links
 
 
 

1982 films
1980s science fiction action films
Italian post-apocalyptic films
Italian science fiction action films
Films directed by Enzo G. Castellari
Films set in 1990
Films set in the Bronx
Films set in the future
Films shot in Rome
Films shot in New York City
1980s vigilante films
Italian vigilante films
1980s exploitation films
1980s Italian films